Several brother companies that design and manufacture firearms use the brand name SIG Sauer . The original company, Schweizerische Waggonfabrik (SWF), later Schweizerische Industrie-Gesellschaft (SIG), went through several selloffs, leaving the SIG Sauer brand spread over several companies. The original SIG is now known as SIG Combibloc Group and no longer has any firearms business.

 The German company was SIG Sauer GmbH & Co. KG. It was formed in 1976 as a partnership between Schweizerische Industrie Gesellschaft (SIG) of Switzerland and J.P. Sauer & Sohn of Germany.
 The Swiss company is SIG Sauer AG. Its predecessor SIG Arms AG was sold to L&O Holding in western Germany and was first renamed SAN Swiss Arms AG, commonly known as Swiss Arms, and in late 2019 was further renamed SIG Sauer AG.
 The American company is SIG Sauer, Inc. Its predecessor SIGARMS was founded in Virginia in 1985 to import and distribute SIG Sauer firearms into the United States: Its headquarters were moved to New Hampshire in 1990. This company was renamed SIG Sauer, Inc. in 2007, and since 2000 is organizationally separate from SIG Sauer GmbH.

L&O Holding is the parent company of the German SIG Sauer GmbH & Co. KG, the Swiss SIG Sauer AG, and the American SIG Sauer, Inc.

History

1853: Schweizerische Waggonfabrik (SWF) is created
The origins of the SIG Sauer company lie in the company named Schweizerische Waggonfabrik ("Swiss Wagon Factory"), which was founded in 1853 by Friedrich Peyer im Hof (1817–1900), Heinrich Moser (1805–1874) and Johann Conrad Neher (1818–1877).

The group pooled their engineering talents and created the Prelaz-Burnand rifle, known as the "Prélaz-Burnand 1859" or "Prelaz-Burnand 1860" rifle. The invention of this rifle is credited to gunsmith Jean-Louis Joseph Prélaz and army officer Edouard Burnand. The rifle was submitted to an 1860 competition by Switzerland's Federal Ministry of Defence. It won and in 1864 the company was awarded a contract to produce 30,000 Prelaz-Burnand rifles, adopted as the M1863.

1864: SWF changes to Schweizerische Industrie-Gesellschaft (SIG) 
Upon receiving the 1864 government contract to produce rifles, the company name was changed to Schweizerische Industrie-Gesellschaft (SIG, German for "Swiss Industrial Company"), known as Société Industrielle Suisse in French-speaking regions of Switzerland, reflecting the new emphasis on their production.

The SIG P210 pistol was developed in 1947 based on the French Modèle 1935 pistol (the Petter-Browning design was licensed). It was adopted by the Swiss military in 1949 as the "Pistole 49". This single-action semi-automatic P210 brought SIG much acclaim, due to the precision manufacturing processes employed in its manufacture and its resultant accuracy and reliability. The P210 frame design incorporates external rails that fit closely with the slide, thus eliminating play in the mechanism during firing. The P210 was noted for its extreme accuracy. The Petter-Browning patent was a refinement of the Browning Hi-Power (P35), which was John Moses Browning's last design which was created for the French 1935 pistol, but not adopted.

Swiss law limits the ability of Swiss companies to export firearms. Swiss companies which wish to do this have to do so by using a foreign partner. So in the 1970s SIG purchased both Hämmerli and J. P. Sauer and Sohn, which resulted in the formation of SIG Sauer.

1976: SIG creates SIG Sauer GmbH
SIG Sauer's line of handguns began in 1975 with the SIG Sauer SIG P220. It was initially developed by SIG and produced and distributed by J.P. Sauer & Sohn, but in 1976 SIG bought J.P. Sauer & Sohn and the resultant company was called SIG Sauer GmbH, based in Germany.

Prior to World War II, Sauer had been primarily a maker of shotguns and hunting rifles. During the war, they produced a handgun, the Sauer 38H, but afterward had withdrawn from this market. With SIG as their partner/owner, Sauer returned to the business of manufacturing handguns. Their Sauer 38H had been produced in competition with other German makers such as Mauser and Walther at a time when new designs began to feature a double/single-action trigger. This double-action trigger mechanism, combined with advanced safety features including the hammer-lowering decocking lever, was incorporated by Sauer into the new P220 design. This new P220 design was derived from the Petter-Browning design and was created in response to a Swiss military and police requirement for a handgun to replace the P210. This new P220 design should properly be called the SIG Sauer System, which was, in fact, the labeling on one of the first SIG Sauer handguns, a modified SIG Sauer P220 design produced for the Browning Arms company in 1977.  On the right side of the slide are the words "SIG Sauer System". This was the first SIG Sauer P220 type sold in the US.

At this point there were three entities:

 SIG, a company based in Switzerland.
 The firearms division of SIG, based in Switzerland.
 A subsidiary of SIG called SIG Sauer GmbH, a firearms company based in Germany.

1985: SIG creates SIGARMS Inc

In January 1985, SIG established a subsidiary, SIGARMS, Inc, in Tyson's Corner, Virginia, to import the P220 and P230 models into the United States.  Two years later the firm moved to a larger facility in Herndon, Virginia, and introduced models P225, P226 and P228. SIGARMS moved to Exeter, New Hampshire, in 1990 where production facilities had been established and production began on the P229 in 1992.

At this point there were four entities:

 SIG, a company based in Switzerland.
 The firearms division of SIG, based in Switzerland.
 A subsidiary of SIG called SIG Sauer GmbH, a firearms company based in Germany.
 A subsidiary of SIG called SIGARMS Inc, a firearms company based in the United States.

2000: SIG sells all its firearms interests to L&O
SIG's firearms subsidiaries in Germany and the United States and its firearms subdivision in Switzerland were all sold to Michael Lüke and Thomas Ortmeier's L&O Holding in October 2000. Its firearms subdivision in Switzerland became a subsidiary in its own right, SAN Swiss Arms AG, more commonly known as Swiss Arms, although its products still used the SIG Sauer brand.

At this point there were five entities: 
 SIG, now a holding company based in Switzerland now with no firearms business
 L&O Holding, a holding company based in Germany
 SIG Sauer GmbH, a firearms company based in Germany
 SIGARMS Inc, a firearms company based in the United States
 SAN Swiss Arms AG, a firearms company based in Switzerland

2004: SIGARMS expands to AR-15s
In 2004, according to CEO Ron Cohen, the company was near failure with just 130 employees. Cohen decided to add AR-15 style rifles to the company's product catalog, which he credits with saving the company.

2007: SIGARMS changes its name to SIG Sauer Inc.
In 2007, SIGARMS changed its name to SIG Sauer, Inc., sometimes called SIG Sauer USA. All new SIG Sauer Inc offerings were designed in the United States. By 2016, it had over 1,000 employees and was selling more than 43,000 firearms a year.

At this point there were five entities:

 SIG, a holding company based in Switzerland with no firearms business.
 L&O Holding, a holding company based in Germany. 
 SIG Sauer GmbH, a firearms company based in Eckernförde, Schleswig-Holstein in Germany.
 SIG Sauer Inc, a firearms company based in Newington, New Hampshire in the United States.
 SAN Swiss Arms AG, a firearms company based in Switzerland.

2015: SIG Sauer Inc expands to airguns 
In 2015, SIG Sauer expanded to include suppressors, optics, ammo and airguns, aiming to provide a greater range of firearm and firearm safety equipment and accessories.  On January 12, 2016, SIG Sauer introduced its ASP (Advanced Sport Pellet) line of airguns, which included CO2 Powerlet-powered pistols and rifles featuring the proprietary RPM™ (Rapid Pellet Magazine) pellet drive system consisting of a belt inside a box magazine-shaped housing, reportedly capable of feeding 30 rounds in 3.5 seconds. These ASP airguns are engineered to have the same appearance, dimension and weight, as well as similar trigger pull, as the company's centerfire firearm models, for the purpose of sporting and training with the added benefit of reduced cost, minimal noise, the ability to practice outside dedicated shooting ranges and less restrictive laws.  In addition to airguns, SIG SAUER also offered a wide variety of ASP targets and pellet ammunition.

2016: SIG Sauer Inc bids US Modular Handgun System
The US military has produced a requirement for a new handgun to replace the current M9 model (Beretta 92FS). In February 2016, bids were submitted by 12 companies to compete for this contract which was expected to result in purchases of more than 500,000 pieces. On 1 July 2016, SIG Sauer was reported to be one of three remaining competitors who were in consideration for this contract.

2017: SIG Sauer Inc wins the bid

On 19 January 2017, SIG Sauer was awarded the contract for the P320.

2017: SIG Sauer Inc popularity in LE
At this point, according to SIG Sauer one-third of law enforcement in the United States used SIG firearms.  SIG Sauer operated a firearms training school – SIG Sauer Academy in Epping, New Hampshire – with courses taught by experienced instructors, many with military and/or police backgrounds. SIG Sauer produces a wide range of accessories for the firearms and sporting goods industry. On 12 July 2018 SIG SAUER announced that the Texas Department of Public Safety (TXDPS) has integrated the SIG Sauer P320 as its official service firearm throughout its divisions.

2018: SIG Sauer airgun division becomes SIG Air
In a press event on 25 July 2018, SIG Sauer announced that its airgun division was renamed to SIG Air, and introduced its Precision Line air rifles, starting with the ASP20 break-barrel gas piston air rifle.  On 24 April 2019, SIG Air expanded the Precision Line by introducing the MCX Virtus PCP, a semi-automatic pre-charged pneumatic (PCP) air rifle based on the MCX Virtus Patrol centerfire rifle and the first PCP to feature SIG's proprietary Rapid Pellet Magazine (RPM™), which uses a 30-round pellet belt contained inside a STANAG magazine-shaped enclosure.  The Rapid Pellet Magazine was later also adapted for SIG Air's CO2-powered training pistols.

On 5 November 2018, the United States Coast Guard, which has long used the .40 caliber SIG P229 as its duty sidearm, announced that it will acquire the SIG Air ProForce P229 airsoft pistol (which was then produced under brand licensing by French airsoft manufacturer CyberGun) as its new training pistol to give cadets and guardsmen the ability to practice gun handling, conduct target practice in various environments, and train in realistic force-on-force scenarios.  In response, SIG Air announced on 17 January 2019 the introduction of its own in-house ProForce high-end airsoft line for professional training, with the initial offerings include the M17 and P229 airsoft pistol.  SIG Air also announced that "we are rapidly expanding the SIG AIR business, and it is important to us to assume full control to ensure all SIG Air products are of the highest quality", and they will no longer be licensing the "SIG" brand or trademarks for sale by commercial airsoft manufacturers.

At this point there were six entities:

 SIG, a holding company based in Switzerland with no firearms business.
 L&O Holding, a holding company based in Germany.
 SIG Sauer GmbH, a firearms company based in Eckernförde, Schleswig-Holstein in Germany.
 SIG Sauer Inc, a firearms company based in Newington, New Hampshire in the United States.
 Sig Air, the airgun division of SIG Sauer Inc.
 SAN Swiss Arms AG, a firearms company based in Switzerland.

2019: Swiss Arms changes its name to SIG Sauer AG
In late 2019, Swiss Arms was renamed SIG Sauer AG.

At this point there were six entities:

 SIG, a holding company based in Switzerland with no firearms business.
 L&O Holding, a holding company based in Germany.
 SIG Sauer GmbH, a firearms company based in Eckernförde, Schleswig-Holstein in Germany.
 SIG Sauer Inc, a firearms company based in Newington, New Hampshire in the United States.
 Sig Air, the airgun division of SIG Sauer Inc.
 SIG Sauer AG, a firearms company based in Switzerland.

2020: Closure of SIG Sauer GmbH's factory 
On 4 June 2020, SIG Sauer GmbH announced it intended to close its factory at Eckernförde by year's end, resulting in losses of about 125 jobs as well as plans to fulfill purchase orders. It blamed "locational handicaps" hindering its sales, claiming "a few other local producers" were preferred in government purchases for the German police forces and the Bundeswehr.  According to SIG Sauer GmbH CEO Tim Castagne, "due to its international orientation, SIG Sauer is systematically excluded from tenders [in Germany]."  This was compounded by reports in April that Kiel prosecutors were investigating claims of SIG Sauer USA, SIG Sauer's North American branch, being implicated in exporting weapons to Colombia and Mexico without a legal export permit from the German government, drawing attacks from critics such as Sevim Dağdelen from the Left Party after Germany published its 2019 arms export data in May.

2022: Next Generation Squad Weapon contract 

On 19 April 2022, the US Army, following a 27-month evaluation process, announced it had awarded SIG Sauer a contract for two Next Generation Squad Weapon (NGSW) variations, the XM7 and XM250 automatic rifle, as well as for the 6.8 common cartridge ammunition used by both rifles. The initial value of the award was $20.4 million for the delivery of the weapons, ammunition, and accessories. The XM7 and XM250 are planned to replace the M4 carbine and M249 light machine gun, respectively.

2022: SIG Experience Center 
In July 2022, the company opened the SIG Experience Center in Epping, co-located with the SIG Sauer Academy. The Experience Center includes a retail store, indoor shooting range, company museum, conference center, and corporate offices.

Products

SIG Sauer brand

Semi-automatic pistols 

Full size
 P210
 P220
 P226
 P227
 P230/P232
 SIG Pro series (2009, 2022, 2340)
 GSR
 Mosquito
 1911 Series
 SIG Sauer M17

Compact size
 P224
 P225
 P228 (M11)
 P229
 P230
 P239
 P245
 SIG Sauer M18
 P322

Sub Compact
 1911 Army Compact
 1911 C3 Compact

Ultra Compact
 1911 Two Tone Ultra Compact
 1911 Ultra Compact

Micro Compact
 P238
 P290
 P290RS
 P365
 P938

Modular
 P250 Series
 P320 Series

Rifles/Submachine guns 
 MPX

Rifles 

 SSG 2000
 SSG 3000
 SIGM400/TREAD
 SIG516
 SIG556xi
 SIG716i/SIG716G2
 MCX VIRTUS
 NGSW-R MCX SPEAR
 XM7
 SIG SHR 970
 CROSS (AR-style bolt-action hybrid "precision hunting" rifle)

SG550

Light machine guns 
 MG 338
 XM250

Suppressors 
 Rifle
 Pistol
 Rimfire

Electro-optics 

 Telescopic sights
 Red dot sights
 Iron sights
 Red dot magnifiers
 Tactical light
 Laser sights
 Spotting scopes
 Laser rangefinders
 Binoculars
 Mounts

Ammunition 
 Rifle cartridges
 Handgun cartridges
 Airgun pellets
 CO2 cylinder

Gear & accessories 

 Training targets and pellet traps
 Pistol brace
 Sling
 Gun case
 Earmuffs
 Holsters and pouches
 Kershaw Knives
 Apparel

SIG Air brand

Air pistol 

 SIG Air P226 ASP
 SIG Air P320 ASP
 SIG Air P320-M17
 SIG Air X-Five ASP
 SIG Air P365 
 SIG Air 1911 
 SIG Air Precision Super Target Air Pistol (single-stroke pneumatic pistol)

Air rifle 

 SIG Air MPX ASP
 SIG Air MCX ASP
 SIG Air MCX Virtus PCP
 SIG Air ASP20 (break barrel gas piston spring air rifle)

Airsoft 
 SIG Air ProForce M17
 SIG Air ProForce M18
 SIG Air ProForce P229 
 SIG Air ProForce MCX Virtus AEG

See also 

 List of firearm brands

References

External links

 
Companies based in Rockingham County, New Hampshire
 
Firearm manufacturers of Germany
Firearm manufacturers of Switzerland
Firearm manufacturers of the United States
Firearm importation companies of the United States
Lüke & Ortmeier Gruppe
Companies based in New Hampshire